Patos-Marinëz is an Albanian oil field that was discovered in 1928. Patos Marinëz has only heavy oil and is in production since the 1930s.

Statistics

See also

 Kuçova oil field
 Oil fields of Albania

References

External links
 Report of RBC and Bankers Petroleum

Oil fields of Albania
Patos (municipality)